The 1932–33 Duke Blue Devils men's basketball team represented Duke University during the 1932–33 men's college basketball season. The head coach was Eddie Cameron, coaching his fifth season with the Blue Devils. The team finished with an overall record of 17–5.

References 

Duke Blue Devils men's basketball seasons
Duke
1932 in sports in North Carolina
1933 in sports in North Carolina